The men's pairs competition began on 4 October 2010. and finished on 11 October 2010.

Results

Qualifying

Section A

Section B

Knockout stages

See also
Lawn bowls at the 2010 Commonwealth Games

References

Lawn bowls at the 2010 Commonwealth Games